Elinor Frances Vallentin (formerly Nichol; (née Bertrand) (1873, Falkland Islands – 1924, Plympton, Devon) was a British botanist and botanical illustrator who made scientifically significant collections of botany specimens in the Falkland Islands. She co-authored the book Illustrations of the flowering plants and ferns of the Falkland Islands in 1921 with Enid Mary Cotton, a fellow botanist.  This work was regarded as being particularly valuable because of Vallentin's botanical illustrations.

Plant collecting 

Vallentin grew up at Roy Cove and at Shallow Bay in West Falkland. While living there she collected and studied the plant life in the surrounding area. From November 1909 to March 1911 she collected numerous specimens from various sites on West Falkland, which are now held at the British Museum, Royal Botanical Gardens, Kew and the Manchester Museum. She also assembled collections of seaweeds that were particularly valuable scientifically. She collaborated with Arthur Disbrowe Cotton, supplying him with specimens, and enabling him to undertake the first comprehensive study of Cryptogams from the Falkland Islands.

Vallentin also collaborated with botanist Charles Henry Wright collecting plants for him, supplying him with field notes and illustrations, as well as illustrating his scientific paper The Mosses and Hepaticae of West Falkland Islands, from the collections of Mrs. Elinor Vallentin published in the Botanical Journal of the Linnean Society.

In 1912 Vallentin presented her collection of some 930 plant specimens, collected in the West Falkland Islands, to Kew.

Illustrations 

As well as illustrating scientific papers, Vallentin co-wrote and illustrated the book Illustrations of the flowering plants and ferns of the Falkland Islands. Cecil Victor Boley Marquand regarded Vallentin's drawings as being "beautiful". Vallentin also exhibited her illustrations at the 73rd Exhibition of the Royal Cornwall Polytechnic Society in 1912 as well as at the 1924 British Empire Exhibition at the Falkland Islands Court.

The Manchester Museum holds some of the specimens Vallentin used to produce her coloured illustrations.

Family 

Vallentin was married to fellow naturalist Rupert Vallentin.

Publications 
 Illustrations of the flowering plants and ferns of the Falkland Island by Mrs E. F. Vallentin with descriptions by Mrs E. M. Cotton (London, L. Reeve & Co., 1921)

References

External links 

1873 births
1924 deaths
British botanists
Falkland Islands artists
Botanical illustrators
20th-century British women scientists